Albeștii de Argeș is a commune in Argeș County, Muntenia, Romania. It is composed of seven villages: Albeștii Pământeni (the commune centre), Albeștii Ungureni, Brătești, Doblea, Dobrotu, Dumirești and Florieni.

References

Communes in Argeș County
Localities in Muntenia